Marcus Petronius Sura Mamertinus (died between 190 and 192 AD) was a Roman consul who lived in the 2nd century and was one of the sons-in-law of the Emperor Marcus Aurelius.

Mamertinus came from a wealthy, well-connected family of African origin—possibly from Egypt. His father, Marcus Petronius Mamertinus, was suffect consul in 150 and his mother's name is unknown.  He had a brother, Marcus Petronius Sura Septimianus, who served as consul in 190, and a sister whose husband was the illustrious senator Marcus Antoninus Antius Lupus. Mamertinus was a kinsman of the grammarian Marcus Cornelius Fronto.

During the reign of Marcus Aurelius (161-180) and Faustina the Younger (161-175), Mamertinus married their daughter Annia Cornificia Faustina Minor in Rome.

Sometime after 173, Cornificia Faustina bore Mamertinus a son, Petronius Antoninus.

Mamertinus and his family could have been at the winter camp of Marcus Aurelius in early 180.  When Marcus Aurelius died later that year, Mamertinus' brother-in-law Commodus succeeded him as Emperor. In 182, Mamertinus served as consul. Sometime between 190 and 192, Commodus ordered the deaths of Mamertinus, his son, his brother and his sister's family. Cornificia Faustina survived the political persecutions of her brother and later remarried.

Sources
 Martin M. Winkler, The Fall of the Roman Empire: Film and History (2009)
 Michael Petrus Josephus van den Hout, A commentary on the Letters of M. Cornelius Fronto (1999)
 Albino Garzetti, From Tiberius to the Antonines: a history of the Roman Empire AD 14-192 (1974)
 Faustina II livius.org (last accessed 27 February 2020)

2nd-century Romans
Imperial Roman consuls
Nerva–Antonine dynasty
Petronii
190s deaths
Executed ancient Roman people
People executed by the Roman Empire
Year of birth unknown
Year of birth uncertain